Coleophora enkomiella is a moth of the family Coleophoridae. It is found on the islands of Hokkaido and Honshu in Japan.

Adults are on wing in high summer.

The larvae feed on Artemisia princeps and Artemisia montana. They make blotch-mines on the leaves of their host plant in autumn.

References

enkomiella
Moths described in 1988
Moths of Japan